The Palazzo Ducale di Mantova ("Ducal Palace") is a group of buildings in Mantua, Lombardy, northern Italy, built between the 14th and the 17th century mainly by the noble family of Gonzaga as their royal residence in the capital of their Duchy. The buildings are connected by corridors and galleries and are enriched by inner courts and wide gardens. The complex includes some 500 rooms and occupies an area of c. 34,000 m2, 
which make it the sixth largest palace in Europe after the palaces of the Vatican, the Louvre Palace, the Palace of Versailles, the Royal Palace of Caserta and the Castle of Fontainebleau. It has more than 500 rooms  and contains seven gardens and eight courtyards.  Although most famous for Mantegna's frescos in the Camera degli Sposi (Wedding Room), they have many other very significant architectural and painted elements.

The Gonzaga family lived in the palace from 1328 to 1707, when the dynasty died out. Subsequently, the buildings saw a sharp decline, which was halted in the 20th century with a continuing process of restoration and the designation of the area as museum.
In 1998, a hidden room was discovered by Palace scholars, led by musicologist Paula Bezzutti. The room is thought to have been used for performances of Monteverdi's music in the late 16th century.

Corte Vecchia

The entrance of the palace is from Piazza Sordello, onto which the most ancient buildings, the Palazzo del Capitano and the Magna Domus, open. They formed the original nucleus of the so-called Corte Vecchia.

The Palazzo del Capitano ("Captain's Palace") was built in the late 13th century by the Captain of the People Guido Buonacolsi (whose family ruled Mantua from 1271 to 1328). Initially built on two floors and separated from the Magna Domus (Latin: "Big House") by an alley, in the early 14th century it received a further floor and was united to the Magna Domus by a large façade with a portico. The additional floor consists of a huge hall (67x15 m), known as "Hall of the Weapon Room" of "Hall of Diet", as it housed the Diet of Mantua in 1459.

The monumental Scalone delle Duchesse ("Duchesses' Staircase"), built in the 17th century and renovated in 1779 by Paolo Pozzo, leads to the Room of the Morone, named after the 1494 canvas of the Veronese painter Domenico Morone, portraying the Expulsion of the Bonacolsi in 1328. In the noble floor of the Captain's Palace is the First Room of Guastalla, with a fresco frieze with portraits of the Gonzaga family, which once extended to the successive room, the "Room of Pisanello", from the artist who, from 1433, painted a series of frescoes depicting a Tournament and other scenes, which were left unfinished. His commissioner, Gianfrancesco Gonzaga, is portrayed in the paintings. The frescoes were rediscovered and restored in the 1960s and 1970s.

Apartment of Isabella d'Este

In 1519, Isabella d'Este moved her residence from the Castle of St. George to this older sector of the Gonzaga palace, in the so-called "Widow Apartment". Isabella's apartment included two wings now divided by the entrance to the Cortile d'Onore ("Honour Court"). The "Grotto Wing" housed the wooden furnitures and the paintings from her famous studiolo, commissioned from 1496 to 1505 to Mantegna (Parnassus and Triumph of the Virtues), Lorenzo Costa the Elder (Isabella d'Este in the Realm of Harmony and the Realm of Komos) and Perugino (Combat of Love and Chastity), as well as new ones by Correggio (Allegory of Vice and Allegory of Virtue). Another hall in the same wing is the Camera Granda or Scalcheria, frescoed in 1522 by the Mantuan artist Lorenzo Leonbruno. The apartment included further halls in the so-called "Wing of Santa Croce", from the name of a church of the time of Matilda of Canossa, over whose remains were built rooms such as the Sala delle Imprese Isabelliane ("Wing of Isabella's Deeds"), the Sala Imperiale ("Imperial Hall"), Sala delle Calendule ("Hall of the Calendulae"), Sala delle Targhe and Sala delle Imprese. Later Guglielmo X Gonzaga, in the 16th century, transformed the rooms of the Corte Vecchia creating the Refectory, facing the Hanging Garden, and the Sala dello Specchio ("Hall of the Mirror"), used for music.

Apartment of the Tapestries
During the Habsburg rule in Mantua, the Refectory was refurbished, with the creation of the Sala dei Fiumi ("Hall of the Rivers") with paintings on the walls on which the rivers in the Mantuan territory are portrayed as giants. At the same time was created the Appartamento degli Arazzi ("Apartment of the Tapestries"), comprising four halls. Three of the latter have tapestries, executed in Flanders from the Raphael Cartoons (now Victoria & Albert Museum) by Raphael, designed for the Sistine Chapel in the Vatican Palace. They were bought at Brussels by Cardinal Ercole Gonzaga in the early 16th century to decorate what at the time was called the Green Apartment. After decorating the Palatine church of St. Barbara and a period in the Ducal Palace's stores, the Flemish tapestries were restored in 1799 and placed in the current location. A further restoration was carried on during the Napoleonic Wars in the Sala dello Zodiaco ("Hall of the Zodiac"), also known as "Napoleon I's Hall", after the French emperor slept there.

Castle of St. George

The Castle of St. George (Castello di San Giorgio) was built from 1395 and finished in 1406 under commission by Francesco I Gonzaga, designed by Bartolino da Novara, one of the most renowned military architects of the time. It has a square plan with four corner towers, surrounded by a ditch with three entrances, each one with a drawbridge. In 1459 architect Luca Fancelli, commissioned by marquis Ludovico III Gonzaga, who assigned several rooms of the Corte Vecchia for the Council of Mantua called by Pope Pius II, restored the castle, which definitely lost its military and defensive function.

Camera degli Sposi

The Camera Picta (Latin: "Painted Chamber") or Camera degli Sposi (Italian: "Bridal Chamber") is the most famous room of the palace, known for its frescoes executed by Andrea Mantegna, from 1465 to 1475, as attested by slab celebrating the end of the works. The painter's decoration creates an illusionistic space, as if the chamber was a loggia with three openings facing country landscapes among arcades and curtains. The painted scenes portrays members of the Gonzaga family.

Domus Nova

The Domus Nova (Latin: "New House") was originally designed by Luca Fancelli in 1480–84. During the reign of Duke Vincenzo I Gonzaga (1562–1612) the edifice was renovated, creating the current Appartamento Ducale ("Ducal Apartment") designed in 1595 by Cremonese artist and architect Antonio Maria Viani.

The Galleria Nuova ("New Corridor") was constructed in 1778 by Giuseppe Piermarini to connect the Guastalla apartment to the Ducal apartment. It houses several altarpieces from the early 16th century to the late 18th century by Francesco Borgani, Carlo Bononi, Spagnoletto and others. The gallery leads to the huge Sala degli Arcieri ("Room of the Archers"), the site of Duke Vincenzo's original apartment. Here can be found a celebrated altarpiece by Peter Paul Rubens (1605), formerly part of a triptych for the church of Santissima Trinità in Mantua, portraying the Gonzaga Family in Adoration of the Holy Trinity, as well as other paintings from now-suppressed churches and monasteries. This room opens to the Galleria degli Specchi ("Hall of Mirrors"), built as an open loggia under Vincenzo I, with frescoes by two pupils of Guido Reni and neoclassicist decoration dating from 1773–79. 

Under his apartment in the Domus Nova, Vincenzo Gonzaga's son, Cardinal (later Duke) Ferdinand (1587–1626) had Viani design a series of ever-smaller rooms, long known as the Appartamento dei nani ("Dwarves' Apartments") and believed to have been built to house the celebrated court dwarves of Mantua. In 1979, however, Italian art historian Renato Berzaghi convincingly demonstrated that these tiny rooms are instead an exact reproduction of an ancient Roman original: the Scala Santa ("Holy Stairway") of St. John Lateran in Rome, and were intended for devotional purposes.

Corte Nuova
The main feature of the Corte Nuova ("New Court") is the Sala di Manto, once the entrance to the "Apartment of Troy", which takes its name from the frescoes (1538–1539) by collaborators of Giulio Romano, commissioned by Federico II Gonzaga to restore several rooms in the Palace. The current appearance of the Sala del Manto dates to the intervention of Guglielmo X, who ordered the creation of the Appartamento Grande di Castello ("Large Apartment of the Castle"). The frescoes in the hall depict the story of Troy, preceded by the arrival in Italy of Manto, a legendary daughter of Tiresias.

Palatine church of Santa Barbara

The church of Santa Barbara, which had the role of Palace chapel ("Basilica Palatina") for the Gonzagas, was built in 1562-1572 by Giovanni Battista Bertani, commissioned by Duke Guglielmo.
As a basilica, it was allowed religious ceremonies with some degree of independence in the liturgy used.

The church has a central plan, with a square tiburium in the middle, followed by a raised semicircular presbytery covered by another tiburium, similar to the other one, and ending into a scenographic apse decorated with coffers. Under the presbytery is the crypt with an oval memorial. The bell tower has a square plan, and is topped by a small temple. Recently the remains of four dukes and other members of the Gonzaga family, including those of Guglielmo, were discovered in the church.

The interior contains two lateral altars, surmounted by large canvas altarpieces by Lorenzo Costa the younger, depicting The Baptism of Emperor Costantine and the Martyrdom of Sant’Adrian. The presbytery has a painting of Martyrdom of St Barbara (1564), by Domenico Brusasorci; and an Annunciation by Fermo Ghisoni beside the organ. Ghisoni also painted around 1566, the St Barbara and San Peter on the other side.

Organ
In 1565 the church was provided with an organ in 1565 by Graziadio Antegnati, a member of a distinguished family of organ builders. The organ was restored in 1995.

Gardens and courtyards

Cortile della Cavallerizza, designed by Giovanni Battista Bertani, who in 1556 adapted the style of the buildings surrounding this courtyard to the Mannerist style of Giulio Romano characterizing the pre-existing palace, called "La Rustica", which also faced it. It was the place where the Gonzaga's horses were shown before being sold.
Giardino dei Semplici ("Garden of Simples", i. e., medicinal herbs), also known as Giardino del Padiglione, built in 1603 by Zenobio Bocchi. It housed the flowers and the essences used by the members of the Gonzaga court to perfume their clothes.
Hanging Garden, in the Refectory (late-16th century), located at 12 m of elevation. During the 18th century, during the Austrian rule, it received a Coffee House.
Secret Garden, part of the apartment of Isabella d'Este in the Corte Vecchia, built 1522 by the Mantuan architect Gian Battista Covo.
Cortile delle Otto Facce ("Courtyard of the Eight Faces"), also known as Cortile degli Orsi ("Courtyard of the Bears").
Cortile del Frambus
Cortile d'Onore or Ducal Garden
Cortile di Santa Croce
Cortile dei Cani

See also 
 National Archaeological Museum of Mantua, museum located inside Ducal Palace

References

External links

Museum of Palazzo Ducale
The Ducal Palace
Society for the Ducal Palace

Buildings and structures completed in 1328
Ducale Mantua
Buildings and structures in Mantua
Gothic architecture in Mantua
Renaissance architecture in Mantua
Castles in Lombardy
Historic house museums in Italy
National museums of Italy
Museums in Mantua
Gonzaga residences
Burial sites of the House of Gonzaga